Islamic court or Islamic courts may refer to:
 Islamic court, a court that follows Sharia
 Sharia courts, in the judiciary of Saudi Arabia
 Syariah Court, in Malaysia
 Islamic Revolutionary Court, a special system of courts in the Islamic Republic of Iran
 Islamic Courts Union, in Somalia

Islamic courts and tribunals